Jennifer Sullivan may refer to:

 Jennifer Sullivan (writer), Welsh children's author and former literary critic
 Jennifer Sullivan (politician), member of the Florida House of Representatives
 Jennifer Sullivan (basketball), American basketball coach
 Jenny Sullivan, American actress